Titus Hjelm (born 15 October 1974) is an academic and musician from Helsinki, Finland.

Academics
Hjelm is a Doctor of Theology and an Associate Professor in the Study of Religion at the University of Helsinki, Finland. Previously he was a Reader in Sociology and a lecturer of Finnish Society and Culture at the School of Slavonic and East European Studies, a part of University College London (UCL), where he teaches culture, social science, and literature courses.   He studied Comparative Religion, History and Sociology at The University of Helsinki and has written several books concerning perspectives of popular culture and social attitudes towards religion.

Selected publications
 Religion and Social Problems (2010)
 Perspectives on Social Constructionism (2010)
 Uusien Uskonnollisten Liikkeiden Tutkimus Ajankohtaista (2001)

Music
Hjelm currently plays bass guitar in the Finnish power metal band Thunderstone, which formed in 2000. Previously, he played with the Incredible Brainshells and thrash metal band Antidote. He states his influences as Kiss, Whitesnake and Led Zeppelin. His favourite Thunderstone song is "Weak." Hjelm entered the Eurovision Song Contest as a part of Thunderstone in 2007 with the song "Forevermore." The band came second in the Finnish pre-selection final "Euroviisut" of that year.

Discography
Thunderstone, Thunderstone (2002)
The Burning, Thunderstone (2004)
Tools of Destruction, Thunderstone (2005)
Evolution 4.0, Thunderstone (2007)
Dirt Metal, Thunderstone (2009)

References

1974 births
Living people
Finnish bass guitarists
Academics of University College London
Academics of the UCL School of Slavonic and East European Studies
21st-century bass guitarists
Thunderstone (band) members